Clara Eugenia Aguilera García (born 3 January 1964) is a Spanish politician who was elected as a Member of the European Parliament in 2019. In addition to her committee assignments, she is part of the European Parliament Intergroup on Artificial Intelligence and Digital.

References

External links 

 Twitter
 Facebook

1964 births
Living people
MEPs for Spain 2019–2024
21st-century women MEPs for Spain
Spanish Socialist Workers' Party MEPs